La Redoute was a French  professional cycling team that existed from 1979 to 1985. Its main sponsor was French mail order company La Redoute, with French bicycle manufacturer Motobécane a co-sponsor between 1979 and 1983.

References

External links

Cycling teams based in France
Defunct cycling teams based in France
1979 establishments in France
1985 disestablishments in France
Cycling teams established in 1979
Cycling teams disestablished in 1985